Stegea is a genus of moths of the family Crambidae.

Species
Stegea clarkei 
Stegea eripalis Grote, 1878
Stegea fiachnalis 
Stegea hermalis (Schaus, 1920)
Stegea jamaicensis 
Stegea mexicana 
Stegea minutalis 
Stegea powelli 
Stegea salutalis 
Stegea simplicialis 
Stegea sola

References

Natural History Museum Lepidoptera genus database

Glaphyriinae
Crambidae genera
Taxa named by Eugene G. Munroe